Tomasi Niuvotu Tunabuna (born 1962/1963) is a Fijian politician and member of the Parliament of Fiji. He is a member of the People's Alliance.

Tunabuna is a former civil servant who served as director for Animal Health and Production for Fiji's Ministry of Agriculture from 2009 to 2019.

He was selected as a PA candidate in the 2022 Fijian general election, and was elected to Parliament, winning 2002 votes. On 24 December 2022 he was appointed Assistant Minister for Agriculture and Waterways in the coalition government of Sitiveni Rabuka.

References

Living people
Fijian civil servants
People's Alliance (Fiji) politicians
Members of the Parliament of Fiji
Year of birth missing (living people)